Kings County was a four-masted barque built in 1890 at Kingsport, Nova Scotia on the Minas Basin. She was named to commemorate Kings County, Nova Scotia and represented the peak of the county's shipbuilding era. (A much smaller barque also named Kings County had been built in 1871.) Kings County was one of the largest wooden sailing vessels ever built in Canada and one of only two Canadian four-masted barques. (The other was the slightly smaller John M. Blaikie of Great Village, Nova Scotia.) At first registered as a four-masted full-rigged ship, she was quickly changed to a barque after her June 2 launch. More than three thousand people from Kings and Hants counties attended the launch. She survived a collision with an iceberg on an 1893 voyage to Swansea, Wales. Like many of the large wooden merchant ships built in Atlantic Canada, she spent most of her career far from home on trading voyages around the world. In 1909, she returned to the Minas Basin for a refit at Hantsport and loaded a large cargo of lumber. In 1911 she became the largest wooden ship to enter Havana Harbour when she delivered a cargo of lumber and was briefly stranded. She was lost a few months later on a voyage to Montevideo, Uruguay when she ran aground in the River Plate. Too damaged to repair, she was scrapped in Montevideo where her massive timbers were visible for many years.

References

 Tom Sheppard, Historic Wolfville: Grand Pre and Countryside, Halifax: Nimbus, 2003, p. 150-151.
 Charles Armour and Thomas Lackey, Sailing Ships of the Maritime, Toronto: McGraw-Hill Ryerson, 1975, p. 180
 Frederick William Wallace, In the Wake of the Windships, (London, 1927), p. 223-224.

External links
 Parks Canada Ship Information Database Registry Information
 A History of Kingsport, Cora Atkinson, Kingsport Community Association, 1980.

Transport in Kings County, Nova Scotia
Maritime history of Canada
Individual sailing vessels
Ships built in Nova Scotia
Victorian-era merchant ships of Canada
Sailing ships of Canada
Lumber ships
Ship collisions with icebergs
Barques
Four-masted ships
Maritime incidents in 1893
Maritime incidents in 1911
1890 ships
Shipwrecks in rivers